Sunčane Skale 2007 is the thirteenth edition of Sunčane Skale, an annual pop festival held in Montenegro.

Day 2 - Nove zvijezde

Day 3 - Pjesma ljeta

Sunčane Skale
2007 in Montenegro